The 1974 Dunedin mayoral election was part of the New Zealand local elections held that same year. In 1974, elections were held for the Mayor of Dunedin plus other local government positions including twelve city councillors. The polling was conducted using the standard first-past-the-post electoral method.

Jim Barnes, the incumbent Mayor was re-elected for a third term. He defeated councillor Brian Arnold of the Labour Party. In the city council voting, the Citizens' Association won seven seats, the Labour Party four and one independent was successful.

Results
The following table shows the results for the election:

References

Mayoral elections in Dunedin
Dunedin
Politics of Dunedin
1970s in Dunedin
October 1974 events in New Zealand